Marc Munden is an English film director best known for his work on Utopia, National Treasure and The Mark of Cain among others.

Early life
Munden was born in London, England. His father, Maxwell Munden, was a filmmaker who made films for the Ministry of Information (United Kingdom) during World War 2. One such film was Song of the People which was a musical about factory workers. Munden studied Maths and Philosophy at University College London.

Career

Munden began his career as an assistant to Mike Leigh, Derek Jarman, and Terence Davies before directing documentaries for television at the BBC.

His first film, Bermondsey Boy (1991), was a documentary examining some of the myths of masculinity, which won a Silver Plaque at the Chicago International Film Festival and was nominated for the BFI Award for Innovation.

In 2007 Munden directed The Mark of Cain, picking up the BAFTA Award for Best Single Drama and earning Munden his first nomination for Best Director. He also received BAFTA nominations for The Devil's Whore (2009) and The Crimson Petal and the White (2011).

Utopia 

Munden went on to direct the cult hit Utopia (2013–2014). The series received high praise for its striking visuals, but also some expressions of concern about its violence. Mark Monahan of The Daily Telegraph described it as “a dark, tantalisingly mysterious overture,” while Sam Wollaston of The Guardian called it “a work of brilliant imagination,” “a 21st-century nightmare” that “looks beautiful,” but also wondered about the gratuitousness of its violence. The series won an International Emmy Award for Best Drama Series in 2014 and Munden received a BAFTA nomination for Best Director.

2016 - present: Awards success 

In 2016 Munden directed National Treasure starring Robbie Coltrane, Julie Walters and Andrea Riseborough. The series focuses on a beloved British TV comic who gets accused of rape. Over the course of the series, the show examines the psychology of this man as well as how his family perceive him. National Treasure received critical acclaim upon release with many reviewers noting the sensitivity of Jack Thorne's screenwriting, the nuanced character portrayals and Munden's distinctive artistic style.Munden would go on to win the BAFTA for Best Director and the series overall won Best Miniseries. 

In 2017 Munden teamed up with writer Tony Grisoni to make Crazy Diamond as part of the Channel 4/Amazon Video anthology series Philip K. Dick's Electric Dreams.

In 2018 it was announced that Munden was to helm the film The Secret Garden for David Heyman & Studiocanal. Based on Frances Hodgson Burnett’s 1911 book, the story centers on Mary Lennox, a troubled, sickly, 10-year-old orphan who is sent to live with an uncle in England when her parents die in a cholera outbreak.

In 2020, Munden reunited with Utopia creator Dennis Kelly, directing the first three episodes of Kelly's HBO miniseries The Third Day.
 In 2021, he teamed with Jack Thorne for the Channel 4 drama Help, about a young care home worker struggling during the early days of the COVID-19 pandemic in the UK.

Help was nominated for six British Academy Television Awards winning two for Jodie Comer and Cathy Tyson.

In October 2022, it was announced that Munden's next project would be a series adaptation of Never Let Me Go. The series is in the works with FX and will be produced by DNA TV, Searchlight Television and FXP. Andrew Macdonald, Allon Reich and Melissa Iqbal are executive producing alongside Munden. It will premiere on Hulu in the United States, Star in other territories and Star+ in Latin America with Viola Prettejohn, Tracey Ullman and Kelly Macdonald taking on starring roles.

Filmography

Films
{| style="width:100%;"
|- style="vertical-align:top;"
| width="45%" | 
Director
 Beverly Hills Is Bournemouth with Sunshine (1989)
Miranda  
 The Secret Garden

Television
TV movies
 Arthouse: Rebel with a Cause (1997)
 Christmas (1996)
 Shiny Shiny Bright New Hole in My Heart (2006)
 The Mark of Cain (2007)
 Some Dogs Bite (2010)
 The Third Day: Autumn (2020)
 Help (2021)

TV series

References

External links
 

Year of birth missing (living people)
Living people
English film directors
English television directors